The Miroslav Holding Co. (original title: Holding) is a Croatian film directed by Tomislav Radić. It was released in 2001.

External links
 

2001 films
2000s Croatian-language films
Films set in Zagreb
Croatian comedy films
2001 comedy films